Boxwood Hill is a locality in the Great Southern region of Western Australia, situated at the intersection of the South Coast Highway and the Borden-Bremer Bay Road.
The townsite was gazetted in 1963, named after a local shrub, Microcorys sp. Boxwood.

The town itself is composed of only a roadhouse and three houses, but is best known for its sporting facilities. The sports club has facilities for football, netball, hockey, cricket and tennis, and is known to host over 200 people to sporting events.

References 

Towns in Western Australia
Great Southern (Western Australia)